Ethiopia–Yugoslavia relations were historical foreign relations between Ethiopia and now split-up Socialist Federal Republic of Yugoslavia. Both countries were among founding members of the Non-Aligned Movement. The first contacts between the two countries were established at the United Nations in 1947 where Yugoslavia supported Ethiopian claims on Eritrea (the end of the British Military Administration and the establishment of the Federation of Ethiopia and Eritrea) while Ethiopia supported Yugoslav claims over the Free Territory of Trieste. After the 1948, Tito-Stalin split Yugoslavia turned towards the non-bloc countries and two countries opened their embassies in 1955. The formal diplomatic relations were established already in 1952. Emperor Haile Selassie was the first African head of state in official visit to Yugoslavia in 1954.

During Tito's visit to Ethiopia in 1970 (part of a tour to Tanzania, Zambia, Ethiopia, Kenya, Sudan, United Arab Republic and Libya) president and emperor of Ethiopia discussed their aims within the Non-Aligned Movement and expressed satisfaction with the fact that the Nigerian Civil War was over in which the Organisation of African Unity played prominent positive role. Following the overthrew the Ethiopian Empire and Emperor Haile Selassie in a coup d'état on 12 September 1974 and during the subsequent Ethiopian Civil War Belgrade made a quick decision to support the new authorities already from 1974 in and effort to prevent strong involvement by USSR which will initiate its own support only after 1977 With the initiation of Soviet support USA increased pressure on Belgrade to stop Yugoslav transfers to Mengistu regime which Washington perceived as being in direct breach of the 1951 Mutual Defense Aid Program, ultimately leading to waning Yugoslavia’s influence in Ethiopia under the Soviet pressure.

Cultural exchange
The two countries ratified their program of cultural collaboration in 1965. Yugoslav exhibition of frescoes copies from the Our Lady of Ljeviš Serbian Orthodox church was sent to Addis Ababa in 1967. In 1977 Belgrade organized another exhibition of Yugoslav photography in Addis Ababa with over 100 exhibits represented the period of the National Liberation War and Socialist Revolution during the World War II in Yugoslavia.

In February of 1988 weekly magazine Mladina from SR Slovenia published a report on Yugoslav hypocrisy in Ethiopia stating that country's military-industrial complex was trying to resolve Yugoslavia’s economic crisis by selling weapons under the pretense of non-aligned solidarity to a country where more than 5 million people had already died from hunger. A week later they called Yugoslav Defense Secretary Branko Mamula a “merchant of death”.

List of bilateral state visits

Yugoslav visits to Ethiopia
 11-24 December 1955: Josip Broz Tito-Yekatit 12 monument
 2-12 February 1959: Josip Broz Tito
 27 January-4 February 1968: Josip Broz Tito
 9-11 February 1970: Josip Broz Tito

Ethiopian visits to Yugoslavia

 20-26 July 1954: Haile Selassie
 15-24 August 1959: Haile Selassie
 2-4 November 1963: Haile Selassie
 29 September 1964: Haile Selassie
 26-27 October 1966: Haile Selassie
 4-5 July 1967: Haile Selassie
 23-25 September 1968: Haile Selassie
 25-30 June 1972: Haile Selassie
 30-31 October 1973: Haile Selassie
 7-10 December 1978: Mengistu Haile Mariam

See also
Yugoslavia and the Non-Aligned Movement
Yugoslavia and the Organisation of African Unity
Ethiopia–Serbia relations
Museum of African Art, Belgrade
Archives of Yugoslavia
Yekatit 12 monument
Italian Ethiopia
Italian Eritrea
Invasion of Yugoslavia
Italian governorate of Montenegro
Italian protectorate of Albania (1939–1943) (including parts of Yugoslavia)
Death and state funeral of Josip Broz Tito

References

External links
 Florian Bieber & Wondemagegn Tadesse Goshu (2019). Don’t Let Ethiopia Become the Next Yugoslavia. Foreign Affairs.

Bilateral relations of Yugoslavia
Yugoslavia